Fjelsted Speedway Stadium is a Speedway stadium in Harndrup, Denmark. The stadium is the home track for the Fjelsted Speedway Club.

The municipality identified the village of Fjelsted for the construction of a motorcycling track in 1971 on the location of an old apple orchard. After joining the Danish Motor Union (DMU) in 1973 a larger track was built in 1976.

References

Speedway venues in Denmark
Sports venues in Denmark